Phrae Provincial Administrative Organization Stadium or Phrae Province Stadium is a multi-purpose stadium in Phrae Province, Thailand. It is currently used mostly for football matches. The stadium holds 4,500 people.

Football venues in Thailand
Multi-purpose stadiums in Thailand
Buildings and structures in Phrae province